Norma Gladys Cappagli (20 September 1939 – 22 December 2020) was an Argentine model and beauty queen who won the 1960 Miss World contest, after being crowned Miss Argentina World 1960. She was the first model from Argentina to win the title.  The pageant was held in London, United Kingdom.  Her prize was £500 and a sports car. After her reign as Miss World ended, Cappagli worked as a model. In 1962, she recorded the song "Sexy World" with Armando Sciascia. The song is featured in the T.V. show Velvet. She died in Fernández Hospital in Buenos Aires on 22 December 2020 after being run over by a bus on December 17.

References

External links
  Video footage of Cappagli's coronation as Miss World

1939 births
2020 deaths
Argentine beauty pageant winners
Argentine female models
Argentine people of Italian descent
Miss World 1960 delegates
Miss World winners
Road incident deaths in Argentina